Eublaberus is a genus of cockroaches closely related to Blaberus. Among the differences are proportionately somewhat shorter, stouter limbs, a broad blackish bar on the caudal margin (rear) of the pronotum, and angulation on the lateral margins (sides) of the pronotum.

The genus contains the following species:

 Eublaberus argentinus Hebard 1921
 Eublaberus distanti (Kirby, W. F. 1903): The six spotted cockroach or Trinidad bat cave cockroach
 Eublaberus fernandoi Lopes & de Oliveira 2000
 Eublaberus immaculus (Saussure & Zehntner 1894)
 Eublaberus marajoara Rocha e Silva 1972
 Eublaberus posticus (Erichson, 1848): The orange-headed cockroach
 Eublaberus sulzeri (Guérin-Méneville 1857)
 Eublaberus variegata Rocha e Silva 1972

E. distanti and E. posticus are primarily cave-dwelling cockroaches of Central and South America.

References

External links 
 Eublaberus species comparison with photographs, from a public internet forum

 
Cockroach genera